Barry Barinada Mpigi (born 1961) is a Nigerian politician from Rivers State, Nigeria. He served as a member of the Nigerian House of Representatives, representing the constituency of Tai–Oyigbo–Eleme. First elected in 2011, he was reelected to a second term in December 2016.
In 2019, he was elected as the Senator representing Rivers South East Senatorial District in the National Assembly under the platform of People's Democratic Party.

References

1961 births
Living people
Members of the House of Representatives (Nigeria) from Rivers State
All Progressives Congress politicians